Variety 7 is an Australian television series which aired from 1963 to 1964 on Melbourne station HSV-7. Hosts during the run included Ron Bond (1963), Michael Cole (1963), and Bill Collins (1964). It was an hour-long variety series, but some episodes aired in a 55-minute time-slot. The series debuted 1 April 1963, and after taking a short break, the second season aired on January 20, 1964. George Wallace Jr. was a regular in the first season.

References

External links
Variety 7 on IMDb

1963 Australian television series debuts
1964 Australian television series endings
Black-and-white Australian television shows
English-language television shows
Australian variety television shows